Lieutenant-General James Douglas (1645–1691), younger brother of the Duke of Queensberry, was a Scottish military officer, who served as MP for Peeblesshire in the 1685 to 1686 Parliament of Scotland. 

From 1672 to 1684, he served in the French army and the Dutch Scots Brigade, before being appointed Commander in Chief for Scotland by James II. After James was replaced by William III in the November 1688 Glorious Revolution, he held a number of senior commands in the 1689–1691 Williamite War in Ireland. He was transferred to the Low Countries in late 1690 to serve in the Nine Years War, and died of fever at Namur in 1691.

Personal details
James Douglas was the second son of James Douglas, 2nd Earl of Queensberry (c. 16101671) and his wife Lady Margaret Stewart. The Earl signed the 1638 National Covenant, but took little part in the 1639–1651 Wars of the Three Kingdoms; arrested in 1645 for attempting to join Montrose's Royalist campaign, he was released after paying a fine. The Douglas family largely retained its position and estates through the various changes of regime in the 17th century.

He married Anna Hamilton and they had two sons, James and William. James received a commission in his father's regiment in 1688 but resigned in October 1691 and died in 1700; William died in 1712.

Career

As a result of the Wars of the Three Kingdoms, many in both Scotland and England viewed standing armies as a threat to individual liberty and society itself. Those who wanted a military career joined units in foreign service, such as the Dutch Scots Brigade; loyalties were often based on religion or personal relationships, with officers moving between armies. Douglas' younger brother John (1647–1675) was killed at Trier with the French army, while Robert (1650-1676) died serving with the Dutch at Maastricht.

In the 1670 Secret Treaty of Dover, Charles II signed an alliance with Louis XIV agreeing to a joint war against the Dutch Republic. Charles also undertook to supply the French army with a brigade of 6,000 men; in a secret provision not revealed until 1771, Louis agreed to pay him £230,000 per year for this. On the outbreak of the Third Anglo-Dutch War in 1672, a related conflict of the wider Franco-Dutch War, Douglas was appointed captain in a regiment commanded by William Lockhart of Lee intended as part of the expeditionary force for a proposed landing in the Dutch Republic. When this plan was cancelled in 1673, Lockhart's unit was incorporated into the British brigade fighting in the Rhineland under the command of the Duke of Monmouth, Charles' illegitimate son. 

However, the alliance with Catholic France was deeply unpopular and England withdrew from the war with the 1674 Treaty of Westminster. Despite this, the Franco-Dutch War continued and to keep his French subsidies, Charles encouraged members of the Brigade to remain in French service, although many enrolled in the Dutch Scots Brigade, including Douglas and a fellow officer from Lockhart's Regiment, John Graham, later Viscount Dundee. The Scots Brigade normally contained several English regiments, which had been withdrawn in 1672 then restored in 1674. One of these was Colyear's Regiment, which Douglas joined along with his brother Robert; he took part in the 1676 recapture of Maastricht, where Robert was killed. By 1678, he was lieutenant colonel, being wounded and taken prisoner at the battle of Saint-Denis in August 1678, shortly before the war ended. After Colyear died in March 1680, he was promoted Colonel in his place.

Douglas was in Scotland during the 1679 Covenanter rebellion, and took part in the Battle of Bothwell Bridge that ended it. As a reward, he was granted the lands of Patrick Murdock of Cumloden, one of those convicted for their participation, later tconfirmed in April 1685. Scottish politics was dominated by Douglas' elder brother, the Marquess of Queensberry, who was appointed Treasurer of Scotland in 1682. To offset his rival Dundee, who was effectively acting as military commander in Scotland, Queensberry needed a reliable subordinate; in June 1684, he persuaded the Earl of Linlithgow to step aside as Colonel of the Scots Guards in favour of his younger brother, who now returned to Scotland permanently. 

When James II succeeded his brother Charles in February 1685, Douglas was elected MP for Peeblesshire in the new Parliament of Scotland. He played an active role in suppressing the June 1685 Argyll's Rising; the Tweedsmuir cemetery contains a memorial to John Hunter, cruelly murdered at Core Head by Col. James Douglas and his party for his adherence to the Word of God and Scotland’s Covenanted Work of Reformation 1685. In October, William Drummond, Viscount Strathallan was appointed Commander-in-Chief, Scotland, with Douglas as Master-General of the Ordnance. Douglas took over when Strathallan died in March 1688 but it is not clear whether he was ever officially appointed Commander-in-chief and operational control was largely exercised by Dundee.
    

In 1685, many in both England and Scotland supported James despite his personal Catholicism from fear of civil war if he were bypassed; by July 1688, anti-Catholic riots made it seem only his removal could prevent one. Just before the 1688 Glorious Revolution, the Scottish army was brought south to join the rest of James' forces in England. After William III of England landed in Brixham on 5 November, his troops deserted and he went into exile on 23 December. When James II invaded Ireland in March 1689, Douglas joined the army in Ireland and was formally replaced as Commander in Scotland by Sir Hugh Mackay, another former colleague. 

He commanded a brigade at the Battle of the Boyne in July 1690, and supervised the unsuccessful Siege of Athlone, whose failure William considered a missed opportunity to end the war in Ireland. He felt this was partially due to conflict between Douglas and two other senior British officers, Percy Kirke and Sir John Lanier. As a result, in May 1691 they were posted to the Low Countries to serve in the Nine Years War, where they could be supervised by William himself. All three died within a year, Kirke of disease at Brussels in October 1691, Lanier at Steenkerque in August 1692, while Douglas died at Namur in July 1691. He was succeeded as Colonel of the Scots Guards by George Ramsay, another former Scots Brigade colleague.

References

Sources
 
 
 
 
 
 
 
  
 
 
 
 
 
 
 
 ;
 
 
 

1691 deaths
1645 births
Scottish generals
Williamite military personnel of the Williamite War in Ireland
British military personnel of the Nine Years' War
Scots Guards officers
Military personnel of the Franco-Dutch War
Members of the Parliament of Scotland 1685–1686
Younger sons of earls